North Macedonia–Serbia relations are bilateral relations between the Republic of North Macedonia and the Republic of Serbia.

History

Post-independence period
Until 1991, both countries were constituent republics within the Socialist Federal Republic of Yugoslavia. Following the declarations of independence of Croatia and Slovenia in June 1991, the Republic of Macedonia declared its independence three months later in September 1991. The army of rump Yugoslavia peacefully left the Republic of Macedonia, therefore the Republic of Macedonia was the only former Yugoslav republic that gained independence without conflict or war. However, bilateral relations were not established immediately.

Establishment of bilateral relations
The Federal Republic of Yugoslavia was formed in 1992 by the remaining Yugoslav republics Montenegro and Serbia. It established diplomatic relations with the Republic of Macedonia on 8 April 1996. The establishment of bilateral relations was conducted under the country's constitutional name - Republic of Macedonia. Serbia, therefore, was one of 131 countries in the world that recognized the Republic of Macedonia under its constitutional name. North Macedonia has an embassy in Serbia's capital city Belgrade, and Serbia likewise has an embassy in North Macedonia's capital Skopje and an honorary consulate in the city of Bitola.

Break and reestablishment of bilateral relations

Following the establishment of bilateral relations, both countries maintained friendly relations, but following the Republic of Macedonia's recognition of Kosovo's independence in October 2008, the ambassador of the Republic of Macedonia was expelled from Serbia. The break in relation lasted a few months. However, Serbia and the Republic of Macedonia agreed to reestablish bilateral relations. The new ambassador of the Republic of Macedonia took office in Serbia in May 2009. The new ambassador of the Republic of Macedonia to Serbia is the former speaker of parliament and former ambassador to Bulgaria, Ljubisa Georgievski.

Church row
A church row has burdened the relations in the past. The Serbian Orthodox Church did not recognize the Macedonian Orthodox Church, which declared autocephaly from the Serbian church in 1967. On a visit to the Republic of Macedonia in May 2009, the President of Serbia, Boris Tadić, pointed out that his country wishes for a settlement to that issue. The Serbian Orthodox Church in the past blocked the visit of the Republic of Macedonia state delegations to the Prohor Pčinjski Monastery in southern Serbia on the Republic of Macedonia's Day of the Republic, the place where the foundations of the Republic of Macedonia's statehood were laid during World War II at the first plenary session of ASNOM. In 2009, however, the Serbian Orthodox Church surprisingly allowed a visit by a delegation of the Parliament of the Republic of Macedonia. In 2022, the church dispute was resolved when the Serbian Orthodox Church restored MOC under its previous autonomous status and later granted it autocephaly. On the same year, a delegation from North Macedonia was allowed to visit the Prohor Pčinjski Monastery, after 18 years of blockade.

Kosovo dispute
In December 2017, it became known that Prime Minister of the Republic of Macedonia, Zoran Zaev, intended to support Kosovo's ascension to UNESCO. The Serbian government responded that they would no longer recognize the country by the name Republic of Macedonia if they continued such efforts. Serbian foreign minister Ivica Dačić stated that it was an example of hypocrisy from Zoran Zaev's government.

Cooperation during COVID
In February 2021 Serbia donated 8000 of their own Pfizer vaccines to North Macedonia, which were received by PM Zaev. President Aleksandar Vučić stated on the occasion that Serbia's only interest with the donation is "friendship and that we may live as best friends". PM Zaev described the act as "solidarity in practice".

Other facts 
A 2022 poll conducted found that the citizens of North Macedonia consider Serbia to be their friendliest state.

See also
Foreign relations of North Macedonia
Foreign relations of Serbia
Accession of North Macedonia to the European Union
Accession of Serbia to the European Union
Agreement on Succession Issues of the Former Socialist Federal Republic of Yugoslavia

References

External links
 Embassy of Serbia in Skopje
 Embassy of North Macedonia in Serbia

 
Serbia
North Macedonia